Psalm 41 is the 41st psalm of the Book of Psalms, beginning in English in the King James Version: "Blessed is he that considereth the poor". In the slightly different numbering system used in the Greek Septuagint version of the bible, and generally in its Latin translations, this psalm is Psalm 40. In the Vulgate, it begins "Beatus qui intellegit super egenum et pauperem". The final psalm in Book One of the collection, it is attributed to King David.

The psalm forms a regular part of Jewish, Catholic, Lutheran, Anglican and other Protestant liturgies and has often been set to music, including a metred German version set by Heinrich Schütz and Handel's Foundling Hospital Anthem.

Text

Hebrew Bible version 
The following is the Hebrew text of Psalm 41:

King James Version 
 Blessed is he that considereth the poor: the LORD will deliver him in time of trouble.
 The LORD will preserve him, and keep him alive; and he shall be blessed upon the earth: and thou wilt not deliver him unto the will of his enemies.
 The LORD will strengthen him upon the bed of languishing: thou wilt make all his bed in his sickness.
 I said, LORD, be merciful unto me: heal my soul; for I have sinned against thee.
 Mine enemies speak evil of me, When shall he die, and his name perish?
 And if he come to see me, he speaketh vanity: his heart gathereth iniquity to itself; when he goeth abroad, he telleth it.
 All that hate me whisper together against me: against me do they devise my hurt.
 An evil disease, say they, cleaveth fast unto him: and now that he lieth he shall rise up no more.
 Yea, mine own familiar friend, in whom I trusted, which did eat of my bread, hath lifted up his heel against me.
 But thou, O LORD, be merciful unto me, and raise me up, that I may requite them.
 By this I know that thou favourest me, because mine enemy doth not triumph over me.
 And as for me, thou upholdest me in mine integrity, and settest me before thy face for ever.
 Blessed be the LORD God of Israel from everlasting, and to everlasting. Amen, and Amen. 

The last verse represents a liturgical conclusion to the first segment of the Book of Psalms. Alexander Kirkpatrick also suggests that this psalm "ends the first book of the Psalter ... with a hope, destined to be illuminated with a new light by the revelation of the Gospel".

Uses

Judaism
Verse 4 is found in the repetition of the Amidah during Rosh Hashanah.

Psalm 41 is one of the ten Psalms of the Tikkun HaKlali of Rebbe Nachman of Breslov.

New Testament 
Psalm 41 is quoted in the New Testament 
 Verse 9 is quoted in John 13:18
 Verse 13 is quoted in Luke 

Judas Iscariot is seen as the man who "lifts his heel" against his friend with whom he shared bread. This is poignant in the context of the last supper, as Jesus washed Judas' feet, shared bread with him and was repaid by Judas giving 'his heel' figuratively. This imagery is also ironic as the Messiah would crush the serpent's head under 'his heel' in a Christian view of Genesis 3.

Catholic Church
This psalm was traditionally performed during the celebration of Matins in abbeys, according to the Rule of Saint Benedict of Nursia established in 530. In the Liturgy of the Hours today, Psalm 41 is sung or recited at Vespers of a Friday of the first week. The main cycle of liturgical prayers takes place over four weeks.

Book of Common Prayer
In the Church of England's Book of Common Prayer, this psalm is appointed to be read on the evening of the eighth day of the month.

Musical settings 
Heinrich Schütz wrote a setting of a paraphrase of Psalm 41 in German, "Wohl mag der sein ein selig Mann", SWV 138, for the Becker Psalter, published first in 1628. The English text of Handel's Foundling Hospital Anthem for choir, composed for a fundraising concert, is adapted from the beginning of the psalm.

References

External links 

 
 
 Text of Psalm 41 according to the 1928 Psalter
  in Hebrew and English - Mechon-mamre
 Psalm 41 – Prayer for Help in Sickness and Against Whispering Traitors text and detailed commentary, enduringword.com
 For the leader. A psalm of David. Blessed the one concerned for the poor text and footnotes, usccb.org United States Conference of Catholic Bishops
 Psalm 41:1 introduction and text, biblestudytools.com
 Psalm 41 / Refrain:  O Lord, be merciful to me. Church of England
 Psalm 41 at biblegateway.com
 Hymns for Psalm 41 hymnary.org

041
Works attributed to David